Baron Tamás Esterházy de Galántha (20 December 1625 – 26 August 1652) was a Hungarian noble from the Csesznek branch of the Esterházy family as the son of Baron Dániel Esterházy and Judit Rumy.

Esterházy served as deputy castellan of the Fortress of Déva and also fought in Bohemia, Saxony under the command of Miklós Zrínyi. He was killed in the Battle of Vezekény in 1652, along with his younger brother Gáspár, and his cousins, Ladislaus, Count Esterházy, the head of the family and Ferenc, the firstborn son of Baron Pál Esterházy.

References

Sources
 The Battle of Vezekény 

1625 births
1652 deaths
Tamas
Hungarian soldiers
Hungarian military personnel killed in action
17th-century philanthropists